is a private women's college in the city of Hirosaki, Aomori Prefecture, Japan, established in 1969. The predecessor of the school was founded in 1923.

References

External links
 Official website 

Educational institutions established in 1923
Private universities and colleges in Japan
Universities and colleges in Aomori Prefecture
Women's universities and colleges in Japan
Hirosaki
1923 establishments in Japan